William A. Wrigley III (January 21, 1933 – March 8, 1999), known as William Wrigley, was president of the Wm. Wrigley Jr. Company, founded by his grandfather William Wrigley Jr., from 1961 until his death from pneumonia in March 1999.  His father, P. K. Wrigley, preceded him as president. He was succeeded by his son Bill Wrigley Jr. as president and CEO.  He inherited ownership of the Chicago Cubs in 1977. Only a few months later, his mother died, and he eventually sold the team to the Chicago Tribune in 1981 to pay off the tax bill.

After assuming the company’s presidency in 1961, Wrigley maintained its position as the world's largest manufacturer of chewing gum by venturing into  Orbit, Freedent, Extra, Hubba Bubba, and Big Red.

Personal
Wrigley was a 1954 graduate of Yale College, where he was manager of the Yale football team.

He was first married in 1957 to Alison Hunter. They had three children, Alison Elizabeth, Philip Knight, and William Jr., before their marriage ended in divorce in 1969. The following year in a ceremony on Catalina island, he married Joan Georgine Fisher. That marriage ended in annulment. In November 1981 he married Julie Burns.

Notes

  

1933 births
1999 deaths
Major League Baseball executives
Major League Baseball owners
Chicago Cubs executives
Chicago Cubs owners
Businesspeople in confectionery
Wrigley family
American chief executives of food industry companies
Businesspeople from Chicago
Yale College alumni